Il vostro superagente Flit is a 1966 Italian Eurospy comedy that is a parody of Our Man Flint (Il nostro agente Flint). Starring Raimondo Vianello and Raffaella Carra, it was directed by Mariano Laurenti in his debut as a director and written by Bruno Corbucci who also wrote the James Tont films.

Plot
When the world is threatened by a series of mysterious catastrophic events from an unknown power from alien planet called Bral, only one man can save the planet...Your Man Flit.

Cast 
 Raimondo Vianello as Agent Flit   
 Raffaella Carrà  as Aura   
 Fernando Sancho  as Smirnoff   
 Pamela Tudor as  Mrs. Smirnoff   
 Kitty Swan  as Flit's girlfriend
Ursula Janis as blonde Flit's girlfriend
Alfredo Marchetti as Flit's chief Hayes

Notes

External links
 

1966 films
1960s Italian-language films
Italian parody films
1960s spy comedy films
Italian spy comedy films
Films directed by Mariano Laurenti
1960s parody films
1966 directorial debut films
1966 comedy films
1960s Italian films